Eqbalabad may refer to:
 Eqbalabad, Eqlid, Fars Province
 Eqbalabad, Jahrom, Fars Province
 Eqbalabad, Shiraz, Fars Province
 Eqbalabad, Kohgiluyeh and Boyer-Ahmad
 Eqbalabad, Yazd